The women's 50 metre breaststroke event at the 2018 Asian Games took place on 23 August at the Gelora Bung Karno Aquatic Stadium.

Schedule
All times are Western Indonesia Time (UTC+07:00)

Records

Results
Legend
DSQ — Disqualified

Heats

Final

References

Swimming at the 2018 Asian Games